Henry Blackwell (16 December 1876 – 24 January 1900) was an English cricketer who played for Derbyshire in 1895 and 1898.

Blackwell was born at Wirksworth Derbyshire, the son of William Blackwell, a butcher and his wife Fanny. He debuted for Derbyshire at the age of eighteen, in the 1895 season, against Marylebone Cricket Club, but didn't play another first-class match until the 1898 season. He played in three drawn matches in 1898, taking a wicket in every game and making reasonable scores as a lower-order batsman. He did not play in 1899 but died at Wirksworth at the beginning of 1900 at the age of 23.

Blackwell was a right-arm medium-pace bowler and took four first-class wickets at an average of 26.25 and a best performance of 2 for 23. He was a right-handed batsman and played six innings in four first-class matches with an average of 10.25 and a top score of 15.

References

1876 births
1900 deaths
Derbyshire cricketers
English cricketers